Camp Wood is a city in Real County, Texas, USA, in the Texas Hill Country, which is part of the Edwards Plateau. The population was 706 at the 2010 census.

History
The town was established in 1920.

Geography

Camp Wood is located at  (29.669084, –100.011641).

Demographics

2020 census

As of the 2020 United States census, there were 517 people, 262 households, and 179 families residing in the city.

2000 census
As of the census of 2000, 822 people, 281 households, and 198 families resided in the city. The population density averaged 1,629.8/mi2 (634.8/km). The 352 housing units averaged 697.9/mi2 (271.8/km). The racial makeup of the city was 90.27% White, 0.12% African American, 0.97% Native American, 0.36% Asian, 6.69% from other races, and 1.58% from two or more races. Hispanics or Latinos of any race were 39.66% of the population.

Of the 281 households, 34.5% had children under the age of 18 living with them, 51.6% were married couples living together, 13.5% had a female householder with no husband present, and 29.2% were not families. About 27.0% of all households were made up of individuals, and 13.5% had someone living alone who was 65 years of age or older. The average household size was 2.67 and the average family size was 3.19.

In the city, the population was distributed as 28.2% under the age of 18, 5.2% from 18 to 24, 22.7% from 25 to 44, 24.1% from 45 to 64, and 19.7% who were 65 years of age or older. The median age was 40 years. For every 100 females, there were 103.0 males. For every 100 females age 18 and over, there were 95.4 males.

The median income for a household in the city was $19,792, and for a family was $21,648. Males had a median income of $17,500 versus $13,182 for females. The per capita income for the city was $11,170. About 32.2% of families and 33.6% of the population were below the poverty line, including 40.0% of those under age 18 and 36.6% of those age 65 or over.

Education
The City of Camp Wood is served by the Nueces Canyon Consolidated Independent School District.

Climate
The climate in this area is characterized by hot, humid summers and generally mild to cool winters.  Camp Wood has a humid subtropical climate, Cfa on climate maps according to the Köppen climate classification system.

References

External links
 Community website
 HillCountryRider.Com website with photos and info and links for Bikers & Cyclists in the Camp Wood & Hill Country area
 http://www.campwoodlibrary.org  Camp Wood Public Library. Everyone welcome. Stop by for a visit.  Free WI-Fi and Internet. 

Cities in Texas
Cities in Real County, Texas